Witham is a parliamentary constituency in Essex represented by Priti Patel in the House of Commons of the UK Parliament since its 2010 creation. She is a Conservative who was Home Secretary from 24 July 2019 until her resignation on 5 September 2022 following the announcement of the results of the Conservative Party leadership contest.

History 
The seat was created for the 2010 general election following a review of the Parliamentary representation of Essex by the Boundary Commission for England which resulted in radical alterations to existing constituencies to allow for an extra seat to be created due to increased population. As a consequence, the new seat of Witham was created which included parts of the constituencies of Braintree, Colchester, North Essex, and Maldon and East Chelmsford.

Boundaries

The District of Braintree wards of Black Notley and Terling, Bradwell, Silver End and Rivenhall, Coggeshall and North Feering, Hatfield Peverel, Kelvedon, Witham Chipping Hill and Central, Witham North, Witham South, and Witham West
The District of Maldon wards of Great Totham, Tollesbury, Tolleshunt D'Arcy, and Wickham Bishops and Woodham
The Borough of Colchester wards of Birch and Winstree, Copford and West Stanway, Marks Tey, Stanway and Tiptree

The District of Braintree wards, which comprised approximately half the electorate, were transferred from the Braintree constituency; the District of Maldon wards from the abolished constituency of Maldon and Chelmsford East; and the Borough of Colchester wards from the abolished constituency of North Essex, except for Stanway ward which had been in the Colchester constituency.

Constituency profile

Witham is one of the safest Conservative seats in the country, although the town of Witham within it is the only area of real Labour strength in the region, being represented by one District Councillor alongside seven Conservative Councillors.

Witham itself is an industrial town, on the Great Eastern main line railway from London to Norwich, with some heavy industry and London commuter belt residential areas – the strength of the Labour vote here was just enough to turn the former Braintree seat red in 1997, and in 2001, on the previous boundaries.

However, the town is small, and the Witham seat extends to cover a huge part of rural central Essex, with affluent commuter villages and farming communities that show high levels of Conservative support.

Members of Parliament

Elections

See also
List of parliamentary constituencies in Essex

References

Parliamentary constituencies in Essex
Constituencies of the Parliament of the United Kingdom established in 2010
Politics of Colchester
Politics of Maldon District